Triplophysa kullmanni is a species of ray-finned fish in the genus Triplophysa. It is endemic to Afghanistan.

Footnotes 

K
Endemic fauna of Afghanistan
Fish of Afghanistan
Fish described in 1975
Taxa named by Petre Mihai Bănărescu
Taxa named by Teodor T. Nalbant